Dawn Denise George (born April 30, 1959 in Gardner, Massachusetts) is a former female boxer who has competed against some of women's boxing top athletes. George moved to Lowell, where Micky Ward, another retired boxer, was born.

George had a negative win-loss record; many facts can be attributed to this: for example, apart from fighting some tough women boxers and world champions, she was 39 when she debuted in professional boxing. Most boxers are considered "old", "over the hill" or "past their prime" by the age of 30.

Dawn George debuted as a paid boxer on April 10, 1998, earning a four-round decision win over Angela Reiss at Worcester. On August 2, she knocked out Jackie Starkey in the first round, but, nineteen days later, she suffered her first defeat: in what was her first fight outside Massachusetts, she lost a six-round decision to the more experienced and younger Mitzi Jeter. Next, she lost an eight-round decision to Hannah Fox on September 23, at Worley, Idaho.

George came back a victor for the third time in her career when she fought Selena Pelleter on November 20, winning by knockout, again in the first round. On March 26, 1999, she lost a rematch to Jeter by a four-round unanimous decision, in Cherokee, North Carolina. This marked the beginning of three losses in a row, including one by a four-round unanimous decision to Summer DeLeon in Temecula, California.

On July 28, 2000, she got what would turn out to be her last career win, knocking out Michelle Taylor in the second round, at the popular hangout, The Roxy, in Boston. On November 3, she drew with Amy Burton over four rounds in Verona, New York.

On December 15 of that year, she faced Chilean Patty Demick in Fort Lauderdale, Florida, and was defeated by knockout in the third round.

Despite her negative record, her next fight was for a world championship: on her first try to become a world champion, she faced Jeter for a third time, Jeter, who had already conquered the IWBF's world Welterweight title, defeated George for a third time, by a ten-round unanimous decision, to retain the title in Dorchester.

George's last fight was her second attempt to win a world title: On January 25, 2002, she faced Vienna Williams for the WIBF's vacant world Jr. Middleweight championship, losing by a first-round knockout in Dover, Delaware.

George retired with a record of 4 wins, 9 losses and 1 draw, with three wins by knockout.

Professional boxing record

External links
 

1959 births
Living people
American women boxers
Boxers from Massachusetts
People from Gardner, Massachusetts
Super-featherweight boxers
Sportspeople from Worcester County, Massachusetts
21st-century American women